Francisco González de Salcedo Castro (1559–1634) was a Roman Catholic prelate who served as Bishop of Santiago de Chile (1622–1634).

Biography
Francisco González de Salcedo Castro was born in Ciudad Real, Spain in 1559.
On 11 Jul 1622, he was appointed during the papacy of Pope Gregory XV as Bishop of Santiago de Chile.
In 1623, he was consecrated bishop by Jerónimo Tiedra Méndez, Archbishop of La Plata o Charcas. 
He served as Bishop of Santiago de Chile until his death on 10 Aug 1634.

References 

17th-century Roman Catholic bishops in Chile
Bishops appointed by Pope Gregory XV
1559 births
1634 deaths
Roman Catholic bishops of Santiago de Chile